Buses is a United Kingdom magazine focusing mainly on the British public bus industry. It was originally published by Ian Allan Publishing; since March 2012 it has been published by Key Publishing.

History and profile
Buses was published as Buses Illustrated from 1949 until 1968. The current editor is James Day. The magazine is accompanied by a yearbook published in August every year for the next year. It is published on the third Thursday of each month. A sister magazine, Buses Focus, featured more in-depth articles, but was dropped after a rationalisation of the bus industry and for publishing cost reasons. 

Due to the continued success of Buses magazine, the publishers launched a show in 2014 called “Buses Festival”. This takes place at the British Motor Museum in Gaydon, Warwickshire every August.

Buses Festival is one of the largest shows for bus enthusiasts to see modern and classic vehicles on display and for traders to sell bus models, literature, photos and bus accessories.

Editors
Charles Dunbar: 1949–1950
E J Smith: 1950–1959
Alan Townsin: 1959–1965
John Parke: 1965–1980
Stephen C Morris: 1980–1999
Alan Millar: 1999–2021
James Day: 2021–

References

External links

Transport magazines published in the United Kingdom
Bus transport
Magazines established in 1949
1949 establishments in the United Kingdom